Kent Farrington (born December 28, 1980) is a professional show jumping rider for the United States. He is one of the top ranked riders in the world.

Early life
As an eight-year-old boy with no family background in horses, Kent’s entry into the sport began with weekly lessons at a stable housing carriage horses in downtown Chicago. Working his way from racing ponies to retraining ex-racehorses, Kent spent most of his junior career catch-riding for many industry professionals on horses that he was not familiar with.

He became an accomplished young rider, winning the Washington International Equitation Medal as well as the coveted Eiser/Pessoa National Equitation Medal Finals. Kent solidified his presence in the sport when he claimed a gold medal at the 1999 North American Young Riders International Competition at the age of 18

Professional career
Kent turned professional later that year, accepted a job with four-time British Olympian Tim Grubb, and later worked with two-time US Olympian Leslie Howard. At 21, Farrington started his own business and became one of the fastest riders to enter the club of earning over $1 million in prize money. He received the Maxine Beard Award, presented to the American rider who best displays true potential to represent the United States on the international stage.

Farrington’s first notable Grand Prix win was at Saugerties in 2004 with Madison; the following year Madison was named AGA’s "Horse of the Year" and Farrington “Trainer of the Year". Subsequent accomplishments include: winning team gold at the 2011 Pan American Games in Guadalajara and the King George V Gold Cup at CSIO Hickstead on Uceko, the Queen Elizabeth II Cup at Spruce Meadows and team bronze in Caen for the FEI World Equestrian Games both with Voyeur, and the Rolex Grand Prix in Geneva with Gazelle. Farrington was the first American to win the Rolex International Jumping Riders Club Rolex Top Ten Final in 2015 and he earned Team Silver with Voyeur at the Río 2016 Summer Olympics, both aboard Voyeur.

In April 2017, Farrington took over as World Number One on the Longines rankings and held the top position until March 2018 after breaking both bones in his lower right leg while competing at the Winter Equestrian Festival in Wellington, Florida. Just 12 weeks later, Farrington returned to the show ring to compete at Royal Windsor CSI5* in the United Kingdom.

"I'm proud of where my team is today," Kent says. "It is a long way from where it began and I'm very fortunate to have an amazing group of people around me that have helped make my career what it is now. I'm excited to see where we can take it from here."

As he continues to build upon his impressive career, Kent stays true to the words of his dad, “learn from everyone, don’t completely copy anyone, and be the best version of yourself”.

Current Horses

Results

2021

2020

2019

2018

2017

2016

2015

2014

2013

2012

2011

International Championship Results

References

1980 births
Living people
Equestrians at the 2016 Summer Olympics
Equestrians at the 2015 Pan American Games
American male equestrians
Medalists at the 2016 Summer Olympics
Pan American Games gold medalists for the United States
Pan American Games bronze medalists for the United States
Olympic silver medalists for the United States in equestrian
Pan American Games medalists in equestrian
Medalists at the 2015 Pan American Games
Equestrians at the 2020 Summer Olympics